North Country may refer to:

Places
North Country, Cornwall, England
 North Country, the northern third of New Hampshire, U.S.
Great North Woods Region (New Hampshire)
North Country, New York, a region of Upstate New York
North Country Community College, Saranac Lake
North Country School, Lake Placid
 Northern England

Other uses
North Country (album), a 1993 album by The Rankin Family
"North Country" (song), the title track
North Country (film), a 2005 American drama film
North Country (soundtrack), a soundtrack album from the film

See also

North Country Trail, an American long-distance foot trail from New York to North Dakota
North Country Cinema, a Canadian media arts collective 
North Country Hospital, Newport City, Vermont, U.S.
North Country Beagle, an early breed of dog
"Girl from the North Country", a 1963 song written by Bob Dylan (which has some similarities to the folk song "Scarborough Fair")
Music from the North Country – The Jayhawks Anthology, a compilation album released by the American alt-country band The Jayhawks